"Mission of the Darians" is the ninth episode of the first series of Space: 1999.  The screenplay was written by Johnny Byrne; the director was Ray Austin.  The original title was "Mission of the Darya".  The final shooting script is dated 7 January 1975.  Live-action filming took place Friday 10 January 1975 through Friday 24 January 1975.

Story 

Emergency...emergency...this is the commander of the spaceship Daria.  A major catastrophe has occurred...  Having detected an alien distress signal, the Main Mission staff listens to the sombre appeal.  The voice of the alien commander tells how large areas of his ship are devastated, with thousands dead and hundreds sick and dying.  The signal ends with a plea for immediate aid—then is revealed to be an automated transmission when it loops back to the beginning.  The vessel, drifting close to the Moon's trajectory, measures twenty miles long by five miles wide.  While John Koenig marvels that each deck measures one hundred square miles, the instruments register life signs.

The Commander opts to mount a humanitarian mission, selecting personnel to assess the medical, scientific and material needs of the aliens.  Eagle One is loaded with relief supplies and lifts off from Moonbase Alpha.  They circle the immense vessel, unable to perceive any recognisable docking structures—until they are snared by a force-beam.  All systems are smothered as the beam pulls the ship in and docks it at an airlock.  Efforts to restart the motors fail, as do attempts to contact Alpha or the aliens.  The rescue party is effectively trapped.

On-board instruments show the Darian ship contains a breathable atmosphere and a functioning power source.  Communications are inhibited by weak levels of atomic radiation saturating the ship's structure.  The life signs are confirmed, and Koenig and company disembark.  However, no one is there to greet them.  They enter a dilapidated reception area accessed by two opposing corridors.  Hoping to encounter the ship's inhabitants, Koenig sets off with Victor Bergman down one corridor, sending Paul Morrow and Alan Carter into the other.

Helena Russell and Security guard Bill Lowry remain behind.  An examination of the area reveals a hatch blocked by rubble; when opened, it reveals a third corridor.  Their investigation is interrupted when two tattered dwarves emerge from the hidden passage.  Male and female, they are mute and panicked.  The male hides in the Eagle while the female attempts to communicate using frantic gestures.  The nature of the mutes' fear becomes apparent when a brutish man springs from around the corner and viciously clubs Lowry unconscious.

Koenig and Bergman have hiked miles down their corridor without seeing a soul.  They are suddenly blinded by the light of hand-torches, held by two Darians fully encased in silver radiation suits.  As Koenig and Bergman lower their weapons, the Darians raise their own and gun down the two Alphans.  During this, Morrow and Carter encounter increasing damage as they proceed.  Eventually, the corridor is completely obstructed, forcing them to turn back.  Returning to the airlock, they find the area deserted...until discovering the terrified male mute hiding in the Eagle.

Finding the open hatch of the third corridor, the Alphan men convince the dwarf to show them where the others went.  Up ahead, a tribe of savages drag Helena, Lowry and the female mute to their camp, a settlement on the edge of a vast, overgrown arboretum.  These Darians resemble futuristic cave-people—filthy, with unkempt hair and rotten teeth, wearing garments of homespun mixed with synthetic fabrics and adorned with accessories fashioned from technological items.  There are no elderly or infirm members in the group.  The brutish man is their chief, Hadin, who orders the prisoners secured in what was once a laboratory module.

In another area of the ship, Koenig awakens in a tastefully appointed rest chamber to find himself under the scrutiny of a strikingly beautiful woman.  She apologises for the assault, but Koenig and Bergman were intruding.  Introducing herself as Kara, the vessel's Director of Reconstruction, she tells him the plight of her people.  The distress signal was triggered 900 years ago, when all but one of their nuclear reactors exploded.  Most of the vessel was heavily damaged.  Thousands survived the explosions, but fell victim to the radiation.  Out of 50,000 Darians, only the fourteen in the command area were shielded from the catastrophe.  As Koenig boggles over the magnitude of the disaster, Kara states this chance encounter could be vital to their survival.

In the settlement, the prisoners are brought before a shrine, dominated by a wall-painting of a male god.  The tribe, who call themselves 'The Survivors', gathers in a circle and Hadin thrusts the female mute into the centre.  There, the high priest benevolently examines her—then proclaims, 'Mutant!'  The pitiful wretch is dragged to a cubicle recessed in the wall and sealed in by a transparent door.  A switch is ritualistically thrown and the chamber floods with blinding light; to the Alphans' horror, the mute's body evaporates.

Lowry is selected next and, during the examination, is declared a mutant when the priest discovers a joint of his left ring finger is missing.  He, too, is sent to his death.  Guided to the Survivors' settlement by the male mute, Morrow and Carter arrive in time to witness this butchery.  Helena's turn comes next.  She sobs, petrified, as the high priest runs his hands over her face and body.  Finding no deformity, he cries out, 'Clear!'  Turning to the icon on the wall, he orders the summoning of the Spirits.

In the command area, Kara presents Koenig and Bergman to Neman, the ship's commander.  (Unknown to them, he is the spitting image of the painting depicting the Survivors' god.)  Koenig insists the Darians locate his missing people immediately.  Leading them along a mile-long gantry suspended above massive mechanical structures, Neman drolly demonstrates the vastness of this ship and the absurdity of Koenig's demand.  He informs them the Daria is a generation ship, preserving the life and skills of the Darian race after the destruction of their home planet—à la Earth's own Noah's Ark.  The ship's drive is still functioning; in one hundred years, they will arrive at a new world.  Neman invites the Alphans to join them and share the future that awaits them.

At the Survivors' camp, Helena has been dressed in tribal garb.  In the name of the Survivors of Level Seven, the high priest offers her perfect body to the god Neman.  The icon wall opens and two silver Spirits—Darians wearing radiation suits—emerge to take Helena.  Carter and Morrow burst from the underbrush and attack the 'Spirits'.  In the ensuing mêlée, Morrow fells one with a stun-blast, but the other 'Spirit' manages to hustle Helena through the door.  Following, Morrow dives through the closing hatch.  Carter, though, is overwhelmed by the savages.

Seriously considering Neman's offer, Koenig and Bergman investigate the feasibility of co-existing with the Darians.  The professor soon makes an unsettling discovery.  The Darians are practically human and have the same nutritional requirements.  A study of their food production system shows no inventory of raw materials on the ship—yet the recycling plants are stocked with a steady supply of all the essential elements.  Bergman concludes the only possible source of these elements could be living human bodies.  Appalled, Koenig confronts Kara with these findings.

Indignant, the Darian woman justifies their actions in the name of survival.  When their own resources were exhausted, they discovered that descendants of the original survivors existed in the radioactive 'wilderness'—savage, degenerate creatures wiped clean of all civilised behaviour.  The Darians managed to teach them the basics of survival, giving them a god who taught them to preserve only the fit.  The weak, the sick, the mutants were to be sacrificed—as fodder for the food recycling system.  Kara informs him their motivation was not self-preservation, but a greater survival...

In the settlement, as Carter is brutalised for his 'crimes' against the god Neman, the high priest prays over the 'Spirit's' motionless form.  The entire tribe is awestruck when, reviving from the stun-ray, it stirs.  Carter dashes over, rips the helmet off and reveals its true identity—a mortal man.  Under threat of violence, the Darian declares he is not a spirit.  He offers to lead Carter to his missing comrades and they, with Hadin and the Survivors following, depart for the 'Place of the False Spirits'.

Neman and Kara reveal their sacred cause:  a gene bank containing genetic material preserved and protected before radiation damaged their people.  When they reach the new world, it will be used to produce the new Darian race.  They confess the survivor tribes are dying out and, without them, all life on the ship will perish.  The Alphans' resources will enable them to complete the voyage and save their race.  Koenig refuses to commit himself until the rest of his party is found.

Morrow follows Helena's trail to the command area and is reunited with Koenig and Bergman.  He relates the grisly events in the Survivors' camp and the fact that the doctor was brought here, though he has lost track of her and her captor.  Koenig accosts Kara, presenting her with these facts.  Frightened, she leads them to a room where they encounter the ultimate Darian horror—the gutted bodies of those Survivors recently offered to the god Neman.  The savages have been harvested for the organs needed to maintain the well-being of the fourteen 'true' Darians.  Rendered sterile by the radiation, Neman, Kara and the rest were forced to prolong their lives with transplant surgery.

Koenig is enraged when he discovers an unconscious Helena in this charnel house.  As Kara revives her, he comes to the realisation that this was the intended fate of the Alpha people had they joined the Darians.  Weapon in hand, Neman appears and confirms this fact.  The Darian commander tries to tempt Koenig, offering unlimited life for him and his friends in exchange for the population of Alpha.  Disgusted, Koenig refuses.

At this time, Carter and company arrive and the Survivors begin pillaging the command area.  The genteel Darians are swiftly overwhelmed by the savages.  Neman enters his command centre to find Hadin approaching the gene bank.  When he runs to protect this sacred object, he is grabbed by Hadin.  The disillusioned savage declares that Neman is not a god—then smashes his head through the gene bank.  His skull fractured, Neman dies, drenched in the material that was to be the salvation of his race.  Hadin then seizes a horrified Kara.

Seeing this as a turning point, Koenig puts an end to the violence.  With both factions gathered around him, the Commander declares their only hope for any future is to work together.  The encounter ends hopefully, with Hadin and Kara sizing each other up.  Some time later, Eagle One departs the Daria.  Helena, traumatised by her experience, is comforted by Bergman.  Carter turns to Koenig, asking him if the similar events were to occur on Alpha, would he choose differently?   Koenig does not answer, silently praying he never has to make that choice...

Cast

Starring 
 Martin Landau — Commander John Koenig
 Barbara Bain — Doctor Helena Russell

Also Starring 
 Barry Morse — Professor Victor Bergman

Guest Artists 
 Dennis Burgess — Neman
 Aubrey Morris — High Priest

Guest Star 
 Joan Collins — Kara

Featuring 
 Prentis Hancock — Controller Paul Morrow
 Clifton Jones — David Kano
 Zienia Merton — Sandra Benes
 Nick Tate — Captain Alan Carter
 Paul Antrim — Bill Lowry
 Robert Russell — Hadin
 Gerald Stadden — Male Mute
 Jackie Horton — Female Mute

Uncredited Artists 
 Ann Maj-Britt — Ann
 Sarah Bullen — Kate
 Linda Hooks — Female Darian
 Ron Tarr — Male Survivor
 Jenny Cresswell — Female Survivor

Music 

In addition to the regular Barry Gray score (drawn primarily from "Another Time, Another Place"), the 'space horror music' composed by Vic Elms and Alan Willis for "Ring Around the Moon" is heard during scenes portraying the Survivors' acts of violence.  The introduction from Frank Cordell's composition 'The White Mountain' is used as the Darian theme.  Robert Farnon's 'Experiment In Space—Vega' makes an appearance, as do excerpts from previous Joe 90 and Stingray scores, composed by Barry Gray.  The ditty hummed by Bill Lowry is 'A Wand'ring Minstrel I' from the Gilbert and Sullivan comic opera The Mikado.

 Production notes 

 This story, Johnny Byrne's favourite of his contributions to the series, was based on real-life events surrounding the 1972 plane-crash of an Uruguayan rugby team in the Andes Mountains.  After ten weeks, sixteen survivors (out of forty-five passengers) were rescued; shortly after, the truth came out they had resorted to cannibalism to stay alive.  The fact that, after 'a million years of civilisation', the Darians could commit technological cannibalism formed the episode's primary theme.  This tale was combined with a spin on racial purity (for 'Darians' read 'Aryans') and placed in similar circumstances as author Brian Aldiss' novel Non-Stop, involving two disparate cultures existing on a generation ship.
 Guest star Joan Collins was already a science-fiction icon at the time of the shoot, having appeared as Captain Kirk's doomed love Edith Keeler in the Hugo Award-winning Star Trek episode "The City on the Edge of Forever" in 1967.  A prolific actress, she had appeared in dozens of films and television programmes produced on both sides of the Atlantic before taking the role of the Darian aristocrat, Kara.  In 1981, she would assume the defining role of her career:  the scheming, flamboyant man-eater Alexis Carrington in the American prime-time television drama Dynasty.
 The hull of the spaceship Daria is seen to include one of the conical atomic-waste-pit caps, as seen in Nuclear Disposal Area Two during "Breakaway"; the model's large central dome structure would be used in the second series as the 'transference dome' building seen in "Journey to Where".  The Survivors' settlement area was revamped from the expansive Gwent interiors constructed for the previous episode, "The Infernal Machine".  The eternal flame in the Shrine of Knowledge burned in the shell of the Ariel satellite prop seen in "The Last Sunset".
 Two actresses playing background Darians, Linda Hooks and Jenny Cresswell, would make subsequent appearances in the series:  Hooks (Miss International of 1972) would be cast in the remounted scenes of "The Last Enemy" as a member of Dione's glamorous crew; Cresswell (Miss Anglia of 1969) would appear throughout the second series as a background extra.

 Novelisation 

The episode was adapted in the sixth Year One Space: 1999 novel Astral Quest'' by John Rankine, published in 1975.

References

External links 
Space: 1999 - "Mission of the Darians" - The Catacombs episode guide
Space: 1999 - "Mission of the Darians" - Moonbase Alpha's Space: 1999 page

1975 British television episodes
Space: 1999 episodes